The 1999 South Asian Football Federation Gold Cup (also known as SAFF Coca-Cola Cup due to sponsorship reasons) was held in Goa, India between 22 April 1999 and 1 May 1999. The Nehru Stadium in Margao played host to all matches. India successfully defended their title by beating Bangladesh in the final, by doing so they became the first team to retain the title as well.

Venue

Squads

Group stage

Group A

Group B

Knockout phase

Semi-finals

Third-place match

Final

Champion

Reference

External links
 
 

 
1999
1999
1999 in Bangladeshi football
1999 in Asian football
Sport in Goa